The President of the Chamber of Deputies is the presiding officer of the Chamber of Deputies. The President is simultaneously the Chamber's presiding officer, but not the leader of the body's majority party, and the institution's administrative head. Presidents also perform various other administrative and procedural functions, and represent their electoral district. Given these several roles and responsibilities, the President of the Chamber usually does not personally preside over debates. That duty is instead delegated to members of the House from the majority party. The President does not regularly participate in floor debates or vote.

The President of the Chamber is the Vice President of the Dominican Republic National Assemble.

The office of President of the Chamber was established in 1844, although the name is not officially mentioned in the first Dominican constitution. Manuel Maria Valencia served as President of the Congress of Deputies who drafted the constitution. The current President of the Chamber is Radhamés Camacho, Deputy at-large. He was elected to the office on August 16, 2018.

See also 
List of presidents of the Chamber of Deputies of the Dominican Republic

External links 
 http://www.camaradediputados.gob.do/app/app_2011/cd_frontpage.aspx

 
Politics of the Dominican Republic
Legislative speakers
Dominican Republic